The Torneo Islantilla Golf was a golf tournament on the Challenge Tour. It was played 1993 in Islantilla, Spain.

Winners

References

External links
Coverage on the Challenge Tour's official site

Former Challenge Tour events
Golf tournaments in Spain